Ras Nhash (also spelled Ras Nahache or Ras Nahhach) is a town and municipality located in the Batroun District of the North Governorate in Lebanon. It is located immediately north of the Chekka cape. Ras Nhash's inhabitants are Sunni Muslims.

History
The Ottomans, who ruled the area of modern Lebanon from 1517 until 1918, settled Sunni Muslim Kurds at Ras Nhash and other villages in the wider Koura area south of Tripoli in 1588 to protect its coast from European naval incursions. The best known Kurdish emir of Ras Nhash was a certain Musa, who was the closest local ally of Yusuf Sayfa, the on–and–off governor of Tripoli in 1579–1625.

References

Bibliography

Sunni Muslim communities in Lebanon
Batroun District